Tagoe is a surname. Notable people with the surname include:

 Clifford Nii Boi Tagoe the former vice chancellor at the University of Ghana
 Eddie Tagoe the Ghanaian actor who appeared in Withnail and I
 Prince Tagoe the Ghanaian footballer
 Rabindranath Tagore the Bengali poet
 Daniel Nii Armah Tagoe the Ghanaian/ Kyrgyzstan footballer

Surnames of Akan origin